603 may refer to:

603 (number), the natural number following 602 and preceding 604
A year: 603 CE or 603 BCE
The North American telephone area code 603
The US state of New Hampshire, which solely uses the 603 area code.
The IBM 603 Electronic Multiplier
The PowerPC 603 microprocessor
The socket 603 motherboard socket for the Intel Xeon microprocessor
Minor planet 603, named Timandra
The Tatra 603 automobile
The Bristol 603 automobile
The Daimler-Benz DB 603 aircraft engine
The Mercedes-Benz OM603 diesel engine
The large number 10603, known as ducentillion (USA and modern British) or thousand centillion (traditional British) or centilliard (traditional European)